Wiktorowo-Kolonia  is a village in the administrative district of Gmina Krzynowłoga Mała, within Przasnysz County, Masovian Voivodeship, in east-central Poland.

During Nazi Occupation it was part of New Berlin military training area

References

Wiktorowo-Kolonia